The 2021–22 Indiana Hoosiers men's basketball team represented Indiana University in the 2021–22 NCAA Division I men's basketball season. They were led by first-year head coach, and former Indiana standout, Mike Woodson. The team played its home games at Simon Skjodt Assembly Hall in Bloomington, Indiana, as a member of the Big Ten Conference. The season officially kicked off with the annual event, Hoosier Hysteria, on October 2, 2021.

This season saw a list of streaks come to an end for the Hoosiers. They finished the season 21–14 overall, and 9–11 in conference play. Along the way, IU ended losing streaks to Purdue, Michigan, and Illinois. As the #9 seed, they also advanced to the semifinals of the Big Ten Conference tournament, something they hadn't done since 2013. They lost to Iowa, 77–80, the eventual tournament champions. The Hoosiers also heard their name called on Selection Sunday for the first time since 2016. After a six year absence from the NCAA tournament, IU was selected as a #12 seed to play in the NCAA tournament First Four round in Dayton, Ohio. They knocked off Wyoming to make it to the First round (round of 64) where they lost to #5 seed St. Mary's.

Previous season
The Hoosiers finished the 2020–21 season 12–15, 7–12 in Big Ten play to finish in a tie for the 10th place. As the No. 10 seed in the Big Ten tournament, they lost in the first round to Rutgers.

On March 15, 2021, the school fired head coach Archie Miller after four years and began its search for the next men's head basketball coach. Just shy of two weeks of  Miller being fired, on March 28, 2021, Indiana University announced that former Indiana standout, Mike Woodson, would become the 30th head coach of the IU basketball program. In addition, former Ohio State head coach, Thad Matta, was hired on to be an associate athletic director in men's basketball administration.

Offseason

Coaching changes 
On March 31, it was announced that Woodson would retain assistant coach Kenya Hunter. On April 5, it was announced that Dane Fife, former Hoosiers guard who had spent the past ten seasons as an assistant coach at Michigan State, had accepted an assistant coach position under Woodson at Indiana. Finalizing the new staff, Yasir Rosemond was announced, on April 14, as the third assistant coach. With over 15 years of college basketball experience, he has helped lead multiple players to the NBA including a few first round draft picks. In addition to this news, it was also revealed that Benny Sander was promoted to Director of Basketball Operations, and Brian Walsh assumed the role of Team and Recruitment Coordinator. Also, Director of Athletic Performance, Clif Marshall, would be retained for his fifth year.

Departures 
Following Miller's firing, six Indiana players from the 2020–21 season entered the transfer portal. Parker Stewart, Khristian Lander, Jordan Geronimo, and Race Thompson all withdrew from the portal following talks with Woodson and chose to remain at Indiana. On April 8, Armaan Franklin announced he would leave IU and transfer to Virginia. On April 2, Trayce Jackson-Davis also chose to return to Indiana for his junior season as opposed to entering the 2021 NBA draft, stating "I believe in Coach Woodson and I believe in the tradition of Indiana basketball" and "I don't want to be someone who ran away when it was tough."

Incoming transfers 
On April 7, 2021, Indiana landed its first transfer from the transfer portal when former Pittsburgh point guard, Xavier Johnson committed to the Hoosiers. He arrives at IU with two years of eligibility remaining, should he choose to use his extra year granted by the NCAA due to COVID-19. Johnson made 81 career starts for the Panthers and averaged 13.7 points on 40.2 percent shooting. He's a career 33.6 percent 3-point shooter. In his last year at Pitt, he had the highest assist rate in the ACC 41.5 percent.

IU landed its second transfer on April 20 when Northwestern Junior, Miller Kopp, announced his commitment. Kopp is a career 35.7% 3-point shooter, averaging 9.6 points per game over his first three seasons with the Wildcats. With this transfer, he is the first player to transfer to IU from within the Big Ten since Max Bielfeldt in 2016.

A third transfer was announced on May 17, 2021, when Michael Durr of South Florida committed to play for IU. Durr averaged 6.7 points and 6.5 rebounds per game at USF. He's a career 47.2 percent shooter from the field and 62.9 percent from the free throw line.

Recruiting classes

2021 recruiting class

2022 recruiting class

2023 recruiting class

Roster 
Note: Players' year is based on remaining eligibility. Because the NCAA did not count the 2020–21 season towards eligibility, last year's Freshmen are still considered Freshmen this season.

Schedule and results

|-
!colspan=12 style=| International Tour Exhibition

|-
!colspan=12 style=| Regular Season

|-
!colspan=12 style=| Big Ten Tournament

|-
!colspan=12 style=| NCAA Tournament

Player statistics 

Source

Rankings

*AP does not release post-NCAA Tournament rankings^Coaches did not release a Week 1 poll.

Awards and honors

In-season awards

Post-season awards

Trayce Jackson-Davis 
 All-Big Ten Second Team
 All-Big Ten Defensive Team
 Big Ten All Tournament Team

Xavier Johnson 
 All-Big Ten Honorable Mention

Race Thompson 
 All-Big Ten Honorable Mention
 All-Big Ten Sportsmanship Honoree

See also
2021–22 Indiana Hoosiers women's basketball team

References

Indiana Hoosiers men's basketball seasons
Indiana
Indiana
Indiana
Indiana